Candan Yüceer (born 4 May 1973) is a Turkish politician from the Republican People's Party (CHP) who has served as a Member of Parliament for Tekirdağ since 12 June 2011.

Early life and career
Yüceer was born in Hekimhan, a district in Malatya Province, in 1973. She graduated from Gazi University Faculty of Medicine and worked as a Ministry of Health practitioner in Ankara, Samsun and the Çerkezköy district of Tekirdağ. In Çerkezköy, she also worked as a workplace health practitioner.

She is one of the founding members of Çerkezköy's CUMOK society, which is one of the most well known Kemalist societies in Turkey formed by readers of the newspaper Cumhuriyet. She also served on the executive board of CUMOK nationally. She was a member and the President of Çerkezköy's Atatürkist Thought Association and was also a member of the Women's 'Arm in Arm' Association (Kadınlar El Ele Derneği) and the Medical Chamber.

She is married with two children and can speak English at a semi-fluent level.

Political career
Yüceer was elected as a CHP Member of Parliament for the electoral district of Tekirdağ in the 2011 general election. She was later elected to the CHP Party Council and was re-elected as an MP in the June 2015 general election. As an MP, she gave her support for workers' rights and industrial action, meeting with 1,871 workers who had gone on strike in a polymer factory in Çerkezköy to extend her support on 19 June 2015.

See also
24th Parliament of Turkey
25th Parliament of Turkey
Tekirdağ (electoral district)

References

External links
TBMM profile
Collection of all relevant news items at Haberler.com
Collection of all relevant news items at Son Dakika

Contemporary Republican People's Party (Turkey) politicians
Deputies of Tekirdağ
Living people
People from Malatya
Gazi University alumni
Turkish women physicians
Turkish physicians
1973 births
Members of the 25th Parliament of Turkey
Members of the 24th Parliament of Turkey
Members of the 26th Parliament of Turkey
21st-century Turkish women politicians
21st-century Turkish politicians
21st-century Turkish physicians
21st-century women physicians